The following is a list of episodes for the Comedy Central original series Strangers with Candy. The series started on April 7, 1999, and concluded its third and final season on October 2, 2000. A prequel film of the same name was released in 2005.

Series overview
{| class="wikitable plainrowheaders" style="text-align:center;"
|-
! colspan="2" rowspan="2" |Season
! rowspan="2" |Episodes
! colspan="2" |Originally aired
|-
! First aired
! Last aired
|-
| bgcolor="#E0B0FF" |
| colspan=2|Pilot episode
| colspan=2|Unaired
|-
| bgcolor="#CA8841" |
| 1 
| 10
| April 7, 1999
| July 19, 1999
|-
| bgcolor="#FFCBDB" |
| 2 
| 10
| January 17, 2000
| July 3, 2000
|-
| bgcolor="#A91407" |
| 3 
| 10
| July 10, 2000
| October 2, 2000
|-
| bgcolor="#6b9cea" |
| colspan=2|Film
| colspan=2|June 28, 2006
|}

Episodes

Pilot episode

Season 1 (1999)

Season 2 (2000)

Season 3 (2000)

Film

External links
List of Strangers with Candy episodes at the Internet Movie Database
Episode Guide at jerriblank.com

Strangers with Candy